Sarisab Pahi is a village in Madhubani District, Bihar, India. It is the birthplace of the scholar Ayanchi Mishra , Shankar Mishra, Ganga Nath Jha, Amarnath Jha, Hetukar Jha. This is the 1st ranked educated brahman's family place in Bihar.

As per mythology the first ranked educated Brahman family was located here. And after that family diversions some people's are moved to other places and started their working and residence.

Sarisab Pahi is in the Madhubani Vidhan Sabha  and Lok sabha constituency. The local language is Maithili.

Villages in Madhubani district